Plasmodium coulangesi is a parasite of the genus Plasmodium subgenus Vinckeia. As in all Plasmodium species, P. coulangesi has both vertebrate and insect hosts. The vertebrate hosts for this parasite are mammals.

Taxonomy 
The parasite was first described by Lepers et al. in 1989.

Clinical features and host pathology 
The only known host for this species is the lemur Lemur macaco macaco.

References 

coulangesi